Agnibesa punctilinearia is a moth in the family Geometridae. It is found in Western China.

References

Moths described in 1897
Asthenini
Moths of Asia